Felicity Isabelle "Flick" Colby (March 23, 1946 –  May 26, 2011) was an American dancer and choreographer best known for being a founding member and the choreographer of the United Kingdom dance troupe Pan's People, which appeared on the BBC1 chart show Top of the Pops from 1968 to 1976. Colby became the full-time dance choreographer for the Top of the Pops dance troupes Pan's People, Ruby Flipper, Legs & Co., and Zoo (credited as "Dance Director"), from 1972 until 1983.

Early life
Colby was born in Hazleton, Pennsylvania. Her father was Thomas E. Colby, Professor of German at Hamilton College in upstate New York. As a child, Colby lived in Clinton and later in Massachusetts. Educated at a school in New Hampshire and Abbot Academy (Andover, Massachusetts), she began attending ballet and other dance classes in Boston and performed in musicals before travelling to London in 1966.

Top of the Pops career
Colby was a founding member in December 1966 of Pan's People. After a few changes of line-up, by December 1967 the troupe comprised additionally Dee Dee Wilde, Babs Lord, Louise Clarke, Andrea Rutherford and Ruth Pearson. Their earliest BBC television appearance was in 1968 on The Bobbie Gentry Show, broadcast initially on BBC2 and repeated later on BBC1. Other BBC series followed, including Happening For Lulu in 1969 as well as The Price of Fame starring Georgie Fame and Alan Price. They first appeared on Top of the Pops in April 1968, and became a regular weekly feature in January 1970. They appeared on several other BBC programmes including The Two Ronnies.

After 1971, Colby concentrated on choreography for Pan's People, and then from 1976 with new troupes she put together for TOTP named "Ruby Flipper", "Legs & Co." (both managed by former Pan's People dancer Ruth Pearson) and "Zoo", for which she was credited by TOTP as "Dance Director".  She also choreographed the rock musical Catch My Soul, and co-wrote an instructional book, Let's Go Dancing (1979).

Personal life
For a few years after Colby's tenure with Top of the Pops, Colby split her time between her family's home town of Clinton, New York and London, but eventually chose to settle down in Clinton, where she lived the remainder of her life. She owned and operated a gift shop, Paddywacks.

Colby married three times: first to writer Robert Marasco, then to James Ramble in 1967, and finally in 2003 to George Bahlke, a professor of literature at Hamilton College, until his death in February 2011.

In the last years of her life, Colby had breast cancer and died of bronchopneumonia at her home in Clinton in May 2011, aged 65, some four months after the death of her husband, George Bahlke. She was survived by a brother, Thomas Colby IV.

Filmography

Television

References

External links
 Flick Colby: Her Story in Words and Pictures (PansPeople.com)
 

1946 births
2011 deaths
American choreographers
American female dancers
Dancers from New York (state)
Dancers from Pennsylvania
Deaths from bronchopneumonia
Deaths from pneumonia in New York (state)
People from Clinton, Oneida County, New York
People from Hazleton, Pennsylvania
21st-century American women